Alestra S. de R.L. de C.V., known as Alestra, is a Mexican IT Services company headquartered in San Pedro Garza García, in Monterrey, Mexico. It provides IT solutions for the corporate sector in Mexico. It is a subsidiary of the Mexican conglomerate Alfa.

Alestra reported revenues of $415 million for 2014. It employs more than 1,600 people and operates five data centers, 3 in Monterrey, 1 in Guadalajara, and 1 in Querétaro.

In 2011, its parent company, Alfa, acquired 49% of Alestra's shares from AT&T.

References

Software companies established in 1995
Companies based in Monterrey